Summerville Union High School is a high school in Tuolumne, California. It currently serves the surrounding mountain communities such as Cold Springs, Long Barn, Mi-Wuk Village, Pinecrest, Sierra Village, Strawberry, Sugar Pine, Tuolumne, and Twain Hart.

About 
Summerville's main goal as a high school is to help students reach their greatest potential. Summerville has many creative classes and helps their students embrace their creativity with many clubs and activities. 
Students are offered a variety of pathways for their future during their 4 year stay.
The schedule consists of 'A' days and 'B' days, with 8 periods split between the two different days. A regular school day starts at 7:55 am and ends at 3:05 pm. On Thursday and Friday, days start at 7:55 am and end at 2:05 pm. 
There are many ways to be active with the school, from dressing up on a certain day to starting a fundraiser for a new class for the school.

History
Summerville Union High School was first named Summersville, but when it was named in 1911, it lost the second 's'.  

The first graduating class was in 1911. In October 2015, four students were arrested for plotting to shoot staff and students at an upcoming event. (2021-2022 wrestling placed first in the divisions tournament.)

References

High schools in Tuolumne County, California
Public high schools in California